Gezahegne Abera (Amharic: ገዛሄኘ አበራ; born April 23, 1978) is an Ethiopian athlete, winner of the marathon race at the 2000 Summer Olympics.

Born in Etya, Arsi Province, Gezahegne's first international competition was the 1999 Los Angeles Marathon, where he finished fourth, behind three Kenyans. That earned him a place in the Ethiopian 1999 World Championships team, where he finished eleventh.

Later in the 1999 season, Gezahegne won his first international marathon by finishing first at Fukuoka marathon in Japan. He won this marathon again in 2001 and 2002. In 2000, Gezahegne finished second in the Boston Marathon.

At the Sydney Olympics, the marathon race came down to two Ethiopians, Gezahegne and Tesfaye Tola, and Kenyan Erick Wainaina. At the 37 km mark, Wainaina tried to make a break, but 2 km later Gezahegne surged to the lead and held the position to the finishing lane. At 22 years old, Gezahegne was the youngest marathon champion since Juan Carlos Zabala in Los Angeles 1932.

In 2001, Gezahegne won the World Championships by a mere second ahead of Simon Biwott from Kenya to become the first person to achieve an Olympics-World Championships marathon double.

In 2003, Abera won the London Marathon in 2:07:56.  At the 2003 World Championships, Gezahegne had to abandon the race due to injury, but he was selected in the Ethiopian 2004 Olympic team. Again. injury kept him from the race. His wife Elfenesh Alemu was also selected to the 2004 Olympic team, finishing fourth in the women's marathon.

Gezahegne's repeated injuries ended his running career at a relatively young age. He and his wife own a hotel and property development business.

References

External links
The Racer - Gezahegne Abera's Rise to World-Champion Marathoner by Neil Wilson

1978 births
Living people
Ethiopian male marathon runners
Ethiopian male long-distance runners
Athletes (track and field) at the 2000 Summer Olympics
Olympic athletes of Ethiopia
Olympic gold medalists for Ethiopia
London Marathon male winners
World Athletics Championships medalists
Medalists at the 2000 Summer Olympics
Olympic gold medalists in athletics (track and field)
Recipients of the Association of International Marathons and Distance Races Best Marathon Runner Award
World Athletics Championships winners
20th-century Ethiopian people
21st-century Ethiopian people